The President of the House of Representatives of Puerto Rico —commonly called the Speaker of the House— is the highest-ranking officer and the presiding officer of the House of Representatives of Puerto Rico. The Speaker has voting powers as it is elected amongst the own members of the House as established by Article III of the Constitution of Puerto Rico. The Constitution, however, does not establish its functions and since the House is the only body authorized by the Constitution to regulate its own internal affairs, the functions of the Speaker vary from session to session—save being called "Speaker" as the Constitution establishes. The Speaker is typically elected during the House inaugural session.

When absent, the Speaker is substituted by the Speaker pro tempore. Its counterpart in the Senate is the President of the Senate.

The current Speaker is Tatito Hernandez, representative at-large from the Popular Democratic Party

Background

The Speaker traces its history back to more than  years ago when the Foraker Act formally established the post on April 12, 1900. Several laws eventually superseded said act, and the post was eventually established by the Constitution of Puerto Rico, specifically Article III, which establishes that, "[...]the House of Representatives [shall elect] a Speaker from among [its] members." The Constitution, however, does not establish what a "Speaker" is nor what its function should be. Internal rules adopted by the House through a simple resolution establish its definition, functions, responsibilities, and legal scope.

Functions
Typically the Speaker is responsible for the observance and compliance of the House internal rules. He also typically:

Speakers

Speakers pro tempore
The Vice President of the House of Representatives of Puerto Rico (commonly called the Speaker pro tempore) is the second highest-ranking officer of the House of Representatives of Puerto Rico. The Speaker pro tempore substitutes the Speaker of the House in his absence. The Speaker pro tempore has a counterpart in the Senate by the President pro tempore of the Senate.

References

Officers of the House of Representatives of Puerto Rico
 
1900 establishments in Puerto Rico